Novi Split is David Jerkovich's (a.k.a. "David J.") semi-solo indie pop/folk act. It is based in San Pedro, California.

Story
By 2003, David J. started recording his own version of lo-fi indie folk-pop under the moniker "Novi Split." The following is his explanation behind the name: 
Novi means 'new' and Split is a city on the Adriatic Coast. In America, when you have a large concentration of a certain people in one place you name the city after them. Little Italy, China town, Korea town, et cetera. There is a huge Croatian population in San Pedro [California]. One night my friend Mike B. wanted to lead an angry group of Croats down to City Hall to declare San Pedro [be renamed] Novi Split. End of story. It always stuck in my head.

In 2004, he released his first album, Keep Moving on Sunset Alliance Records. While, according to David J., he wrote and recorded each individual song in under an hour, that lo-fi record received quite positive reviews from critics.

After releasing Novi Split's first record, Kind of Like Spitting broke up. Consequently, David J. signed a new record deal with Hush Records to replace KOLS among its stable of bands, and to gain a wider distribution for his own music.

Since then, Novi Split has released one album, Pink in the Sink and one EP, Hollow Notes. Each of these records have received positive reviews and have even led to Novi Split's music being featured on the popular WB/CW television series One Tree Hill on two occasions. Episode 7.06, "Deep Ocean Vast Sea" featured the song Leaving It from Pink in the Sink, and episode 7.01, "4:30am (Apparently They Were Travelling Abroad)," featured the song Hollow Notes, which can be found on the DECA Compilation and well as the Hollow Notes EP.

Discography

Albums

Compilations
 DECA: A Hush 10th Anniversary Compilation (Hush Records, 2008)
Song: Hollow Notes
 Sunset Alliance Discography 2002 - 2004 (Sunset Alliance, 2011)
Various previously released songs
 Mountain Main Records Presents: Friends and Family-A Benefit for Hunger Relief (Mountain Man Records, 2012)
Song: Creeping Around Your Face

References

External links
 

Living people
Year of birth missing (living people)